Leonardo Leo (5 August 1694 – 31 October 1744), more correctly Leonardo Ortensio Salvatore de Leo, was a Baroque composer.

Biography
Leo was born in San Vito degli Schiavoni (currently known as San Vito dei Normanni, province of Brindisi) in the Apulia region, then part of the Kingdom of Naples.

He became a student at the Conservatorio della Pietà dei Turchini at Naples in 1703, and was a pupil first of Francesco Provenzale and later of Nicola Fago. It has been supposed that he was a pupil of Pitoni and Alessandro Scarlatti, but he could not possibly have studied with either of these composers, although he was undoubtedly influenced by their compositions. His earliest known work was a sacred drama, L'infedelta abbattuta, performed by his fellow-students in 1712.

In 1714 he produced, at the court theatre, an opera, Pisistrato, which was much admired.

He held various posts at the royal chapel, and continued to write for the stage, besides teaching at the conservatory. After adding comic scenes to Francesco Gasparini's Bajazette in 1722 for performance at Naples, he composed comic operas in Neapolitan such as La'mpeca scoperta in 1723, and L'Alidoro in 1740.
His most famous comic opera was Amor vuol sofferenza (1739), better known as La Finta Frascatana, highly praised by De Brosses. He was equally distinguished as a composer of serious opera, Demofoonte (1735), Farnace (1737) and L'Olimpiade (1737) being his most famous works in this branch, and is still better known as a composer of sacred music.

He died of a stroke while engaged in the composition of new arias for a revival of La Finta Frascatana.
Leo was the first of the Neapolitan school to obtain a complete mastery over modern harmonic counterpoint. His sacred music is masterly and dignified, logical rather than passionate, and free from the sentimentality which is present in the work of Francesco Durante and Giovanni Battista Pergolesi. His serious operas suffer from a coldness and severity of style, but in his comic operas he shows a keen sense of humour. His ensemble movements are spirited, but never worked up to a strong climax.

A fine and characteristic example of his sacred music is the Dixit Dominus in C, edited by CV Stanford and published by Novello. A number of songs from operas are accessible in modern editions.

Operas

Drammi per musica 
Sofonisba (Naples, Teatro San Bartolomeo, 1719)
Cajo Gracco (Teatro San Bartolomeo, 1720)
Bajazette (1722)
Tamerlano (Rome, 1722)
Timocrate (Venice, 1723)
Zenobia in Palmira (Naples, Teatro San Bartolomeo, 1725)
Astianatte (1725)
La somiglianza (Naples, Teatro dei Fiorentini, 1726)
L'Orismene, overo dagli sdegni gli amori (Naples, Teatro Nuovo, 1726)
Ciro riconosciuto (1727)
Argene (1728)
La zingara (intermezzo, 1731)
Intermezzi per l'Argene (1731)
Catone (Venice, 1732)
Demetrio (Maples, Teatro San Bartolomeo, 1732)
Amore dà senno (Naples, Teatro Nuovo, 1733)
Emira (with intermezzi by Ignazio Prota, 1735)
La clemenza di Tito (1735)
Onore vince amore (Naples, Teatro dei Fiorentini, 1736)
La simpatia del sangue (1737)
Siface (1737)
Amor vuol sofferenza 1739
Festa teatrale (1739)
La contesa dell'Amore e della virtù (1740)
Scipione nelle Spagne (1740)
L'Alidoro (1740)
Alessandro (1741)
Demoofonte (1741)
L'impresario delle Isole Canarie (1741)
Andromaca (1742)
L'ambizione delusa (Leo) 1742 (opera seria)
Decebalo (Leo) 1743
Vologeso (1744)
La finta Frascatana (1744)

Undated operas:
Artaserse
Lucio Papirio
Arianna e Teseo (cantata teatrale)
L'Olimpiade
Evergete
Il matrimonio anascoso
Alessandro nell'Indie
Il Medo
Nitocri, regina di egitto
Il Pisistrate
Il trionfo di Camillo
Le nozze di Psiche
Achille in Sciro

Selected recordings
2002 Concerto for 4 Violins and Strings in D -Conductor: Reinhard Goebel, Orchestra: Cologne Musica Antiqua
Label: Archiv Masters  (Disc Title:  Italian Violin Concertos)

2001  Concerto 4 violins and Strings in D - Performers: Elizabeth Wallfisch, Nicholas Kraemer
Orchestra: The Raglan Baroque Players
Label: Hyperion (Disc Title: The Neapolitans - Pergolesi, Durante, Leo)

2001:  6 Cello Concertos-Performer: Hidemi Suzuki, Makoto Akatsu Orchestra: Orchestra Van Wassenaer
Label: BIS (Disc Title: Leo-Six Cello Concertos)

2000:  Così del vostro suono (Il Tionfo della Gloria), cantata Sorge Lidia la notte, cantata with violins,
più dell'usato, cantata for solo voice & strings- Conductor: Cosimo Prontera Performer: Cristina Miatello, Emanuele Bianchi
Orchestra: La Confraternita de' Musici
Label: Tactus (Disc Title: Leonardo Leo: Serenate e Cantate)

For a more complete discography of Leo, see http://www.leonardoleo.com/discography.htm

See also

References

Peter van Tour: Counterpoint and Partimento: Methods of Teaching Composition in Late Eighteenth-Century Naples. 2015. 318p. (Studia musicologica Upsaliensia, 0081-6744 ; 25)  .

Sources

External links

 
 
 
 Istituto Internazionale per lo studio del '700 musicale napoletano
  from Pula, Croatia chant Libera me

1694 births
1744 deaths
18th-century Italian male musicians
18th-century Italian composers
Neapolitan school composers
Italian Baroque composers
Italian opera composers
Italian male classical composers
Male opera composers
People from the Province of Brindisi